Danny Dunne (14 April 1876 – 9 May 1919) was an Australian rules footballer who played with St Kilda in the Victorian Football League (VFL).

References

External links 

1876 births
1919 deaths
Australian rules footballers from Victoria (Australia)
St Kilda Football Club players